Steve Chiongbian Solon is a Filipino politician from the province of Sarangani in the Philippines. Governor Steve Chiongbian Solon is a public servant who emerged from the business community. He comes from a family with a long and successful history in business and public service.

After receiving his Associate’s Degree from Valley Forge Military Academy in Pennsylvania, he completed his Bachelor of Science degree in Business Administration from Fordham University in New York.

Straight out of college, Steve passed the General Securities Representative Exam (Series 7) and the Uniform Securities Agent State Law Examination (Series 63) and became a licensed stock broker on Wall Street.

After spending several years in the United States, Steve moved back to the Philippines in 1996 and continued his career in the financial industry managing several local and global equities portfolios. It was also during this time, as a working student, Steve obtained a Master of Business Administration degree from the Ateneo Graduate School of Business, and graduated on the Dean’s List. He then went on to spend another two years securing another Master’s degree in International Development Policy from Duke University’s, Sanford School of Public Policy in North Carolina.

In 2007, Steve ran for vice governor of Sarangani and spent two terms heading the legislative branch of government. In 2013, Steve became the fourth governor of Sarangani Province.

References

External links
Province of Sarangani

Living people
Governors of Sarangani
PDP–Laban politicians
Year of birth missing (living people)